Play On is the third studio album by American country music singer Carrie Underwood. It was released in the United States on November 3, 2009, through Arista Nashville. Play On was produced by Mark Bright who also produced Underwood's Carnival Ride and seven other songs off of Some Hearts.

The album debuted at number 1 on the Billboard 200 with first week sales of 318,000 copies, which was rated as the highest first-week sales for a female artist in 2009 upon release. It is her second album to debut at number 1 on the Billboard 200, and her third to debut atop the Billboard Top Country Albums chart. As of October 2016, the album has been certified 3× Platinum by the RIAA, Platinum by the CRIA and Gold by the ARIA. Play On has since sold over three million copies worldwide. "Temporary Home" and "Mama's Song" were both nominated for Grammy Awards, while Play On was nominated for Album of the Year at both the 2010 Academy of Country Music Awards and Country Music Association Awards, and won Favorite Country Album at the 2010 American Music Awards.

The album spawned three consecutive Billboard Hot Country Songs number 1 singles — "Cowboy Casanova", "Temporary Home" and "Undo It", all of which certified Multi-Platinum or Platinum by the RIAA. The fourth single, "Mama's Song", reached number 2 on the chart and received a Gold certification from the RIAA. "Cowboy Casanova" achieved one of the biggest single-week upwards on the Billboard Hot 100 of all time, when it climbed 96–11 in its second week.

Background

Songwriter Luke Laird said of writing the album's title track, "Carrie had pretty much blocked out three months to write for this album, and she probably wrote over 60 songs during that period. This was the first time Natalie and Carrie had met, and "Play On" was actually the second song we wrote that day. When we finished writing the first song, Carrie went downstairs to get a drink, and I told Natalie, "I'll bet she's going to want to write another song." Because when Carrie comes in to write, she's ready to work all day."

The album was originally to have included some songs that Underwood wrote with Ne-Yo. One of the tracks entitled "Look at Me" was previously recorded by country singer, Alan Jackson, on the Billy: The Early Years soundtrack. Vince Gill sang background vocals on the track. "Mama's Song" sold more than 31,000 copies in its debut week.

Promotion
Prior to the release of Play On, three promotional singles were made available by iTunes. "Mama's Song" released on October 12 followed by          "Temporary Home" which was released on October 20 and "Undo It" released on October 27. Billboard.com also posted a 60-second clip of each song being released on iTunes.

On October 16, 2009, Underwood performed in Singapore to promote the album to the Asian media. The album was released on November 2 in various parts of Asia, followed by a November 3 release in the United States. Underwood performed on The Late Show with David Letterman on November 2, and performed a special outdoor concert at Lincoln Center on Good Morning America on the release day, and rounded out her week with a visit to Live with Regis and Kelly on November 5.

She debuted several of her singles at the Academy of Country Music Awards and the Country Music Association Awards.

She also appeared on several shows to promote her album including Late Show with David Letterman, The Ellen DeGeneres Show, Live With Regis and Kelly, Good Morning America, The Tonight Show on NBC, Jimmy Kimmel Live!, American Music Awards, CNN International, and at the Grand Ole Opry.

On the November 16, 2009, episode of The Tonight Show with Conan O'Brien, Underwood performed "Temporary Home", which became the second official single from Play On.

Singles
"Cowboy Casanova" served as the lead single for Play On. The song was released on September 14, 2009, two months before the album's official release and debuted on the U.S. Billboard Hot Country Songs at number 26, the fifth highest debut by a female artist on the chart. It jumped from number 96 to number 11 on the Billboard Hot 100 in its second week, one of the biggest single-week upwards on the chart of all time. The song received a nomination for Song of the Year at the 45th ACM Awards where Underwood was nominated as an artist and a composer. The music video for "Cowboy Casanova" was released in October 2009. The song has sold 2,300,000 copies in the United States and has been certified 2× platinum.

"Temporary Home", the second single, was released to country radio starting the week of December 14, 2009. The song has hit at number 1 on the U.S. Billboard Hot Country Songs becoming her ninth number 1 song in the process. It has also hit number 41 on the U.S. Billboard Hot 100. The music video for the song was released in February 2010. Underwood won the CMT award for Best Live Performance at the 2010 CMT Awards for her performance during her personal CMT Invitation Only. The song received a nomination at the 53rd Grammy Awards for Best Female Country Vocal performance. The song sold 1,093,000 copies and has been certified Platinum by the RIAA.

The third single, "Undo It", was released on May 24, 2010. Underwood performed the song on the season finale of American Idol and at the 2010 CMT Music Awards. The song peaked at number 23rd on the Hot 100, giving Underwood her eleventh Top 40 single and reached number 1 on Hot Country Songs chart. "Undo It" was nominated for the 2010 Teen Choice Award for 'Choice Country Song' and sold 1,600,000 copies making it a certified Platinum single.

The fourth single, "Mama's Song", was officially released to radio on September 13, 2010. Underwood announced its release in an interview after her performance on The Today Show on NBC on July 30. The music video premiered on VEVO on September 24, 2010. "Mama's Song" reached the number 2 position on the country charts. It has been certified Gold and has sold 443,000 copies. At the 54th Grammy Awards, the song was nominated for Best Country Solo Performance.

Promotional singles
Prior to the release of the album, three promotional singles were released exclusively on Apple's iTunes Store. These promotional singles should not be confused with ordinary singles.

"Mama's Song" was the first promotional single and was released on October 12, 2009. It was released to radio as the fourth official single off the album on September 13, 2010. "Temporary Home" was the second promotional single and was released on October 20, 2009. It was released to radio as the second official single off the album on December 14, 2009. "Undo It" was the final promotional single and was released on October 27, 2009. It was released to radio as the third official single off the album on May 24, 2010.

"Temporary Home" received multiple forms of promotion, including performances on the Tonight Show with Conan O'Brien, the television special "A Home For the Holidays", Underwood's personal CMT Invitation Only event, Underwood's Christmas variety show entitled "Carrie Underwood: An All-Star Holiday Special", at the 45th ACM Awards, and on her Play On Tour.

After Underwood performed the track "Change" during the 2010 Idol Gives Back, the song received a 2,001% gain in sales, selling 9,000 to a total of 53,000 digital downloads.  "Look at Me", a cover of a song originally by Alan Jackson, debuted at No. 22 on Country Digital Songs in 2014 after it appeared in a viral video, and sold 18,000 copies for the week for a total of 80,000 sold.

Tours

North American Tour
Underwood began the Play On Tour on March 11, 2010. The tour includes several legs traveling across the globe, with the first and second leg focusing on the United States and Canada. Her opening acts/guest performers for the spring tour were Craig Morgan and Sons of Sylvia. The second leg included Sons of Sylvia and country singer Billy Currington. The first leg began in Reading, Pennsylvania on March 11, and concluded in St. Paul, Minnesota at the Minnesota State Fair on August 31. The second leg began on September 25, in Portland, Oregon, and concluded on December 19, in Calgary, Alberta, Canada.

The tour was ranked at number 15 on the Top 100 Tours in July 2010 for the first half of the year. Within four months of the tour's first leg, it raked in an approximate total of $18,400,000, and sold over 375,000 tickets.

In December 2010, the tour ranked at number 19 for the largest North American tours of 2010, and again at number 31 for the largest tours worldwide for the 2010 touring year. The tour made a collective total of $38,300,000  and reached to over one million fans, becoming Underwood's largest tour to date.

Australian Tour
On May 16, 2011, Sony Music and Underwood collectively announced the singer would travel to Australia in June 2011 to promote her Play On album for her first international headline tour. During the tour's duration, Underwood would also release the Play On: Deluxe Edition exclusively to Australia. The album included six previous number 1 singles of Underwood's, as well as a studio recording of "Home Sweet Home", a recording in which has never been featured on an album before.

Critical reception

Play On had a score of 54 out of 100 from Metacritic based on "mixed or average reviews" from music critics. Stephen Thomas Erlewine of AllMusic gave the album 2.5 out of 5 stars. He argues that "Carrie is still nominally a country artist and sometimes will sing supported by fiddles and steel guitar, but this is crossover pop pure and simple, whether it's the thundering rhythms on the Shania-styled strut "Cowboy Casanova" or the succession of maudlin melodies on the preponderance of power ballads." In his Consumer Guide, Robert Christgau gave the album a "dud" rating. Leah Greenblatt rated it B in Entertainment Weekly, saying "If it seems vaguely insulting to call the smashingly successful American Idol alum's material formulaic, know at least that it is, three albums in, one of the most well-honed formulas in the business."

Sean Daly from the St. Petersburg Times argues that Play On is Underwood's "weakest album to date," but predicts that the album will "sell like gangbusters." Daly says that "Cowboy Casanova", "co-written by 50 Cent buddy Mike Elizondo, brazenly bites from both 'Before He Cheats' and 'Last Name'." Daly highlights the song "Someday When I Stop Loving You". He says that it "is so good. It has a vague '70s feel, reminiscent of all those great old Chicago songs."

Accolades

Commercial performance
Play On debuted at number 1 on the Billboard Top Country Albums Chart, as well as the Billboard 200, with first week sales of 318,000 copies, and rated as the highest first week sales for a female artist in 2009, before being overtaken by Susan Boyle a few weeks later. In its second week, the album slipped to number 3 with sales of 128,000. Play On spent nine consecutive weeks at number 2 in Top Country Albums Chart, and stayed in the Top 10 of the Billboard 200 for its first eight weeks of release. By October 2015, the album had sold 2,300,000 copies in the US, and it was certified 3× Platinum by the RIAA on October 24, 2016, for three million units in sales and streams.

The album debuted at number 114 on the Japan Oricon Albums Chart and number 93 on the UK Albums Chart, becoming Underwood's first entry on both charts. In Canada, the album debuted at number 2 on the Canadian charts with 15,000 sales. In Australia, it debuted at number 3 on the Top 20 Country Albums chart and at number 80 on the National Album Charts ARIA Top 100. Underwood traveled to Australia for a promotional tour for the deluxe edition of Play On during June 2011. For the chart week following her promotional tour, the album re-entered both the Top 20 Country Albums chart and the National Album Charts ARIA Top 100 at number 2 and number 14. The album rose to number one on the Top 20 Country Albums chart the following week giving Underwood her first number 1 album in Australia, and remained stable on the National Album Charts ARIA Top 100, at number 15. It has reached Gold status in Australia and it is her first album to do so. Play On has since sold over three million copies worldwide.

Play On charted at number seventy three on Billboard 200 and at number 15 on Top Country Albums for the year ending 2009. In December 2010, the album  was placed on Billboards Year-End Charts, landing at number four for Country Albums, and at number twelve for Billboard 200 Albums. The following year, it charted at number 37 for Country Albums  and number 176 for Billboard 200 Albums.

Track listingNotes The compact disc version of the deluxe edition is a two-disc package. 
 The track numbers on disc 2 are numbered 1–7, which corresponds to numbers 14–20 listed above.

PersonnelVocalsAshley Clark – lead vocals (12)
Lisa Cochran – backing vocals (3, 4, 5, 7, 9, 11, 13)
Perry Coleman – backing vocals (3, 5, 9, 11)
Vince Gill – backing vocals(10)
Wes Hightower – backing vocals(4, 6, 7, 13)
Hillary Lindsey – backing vocals (6, 8)
Sons of Sylvia – backing vocals (12)
Carrie Underwood – lead vocals, backing vocalsMusiciansBeth Beeson – French horn (4)
Tom Bukovac – electric guitar (3, 5, 7, 8, 10-13)
Ashley Clark – acoustic guitar (12)
Adam Clark – mandolin (12)
Austin Clark – lap steel guitar (12)
Eric Darken – percussion (3, 4, 5, 7, 8, 9, 11, 13)
Shannon Forrest – drums (3, 4, 6, 8-13)
Jon Graboff – guitar (2), steel guitar (2)
Carl Gorodetzky – string contractor (4)
Kenny Greenberg – electric guitar (1, 5-8)
Aubrey Haynie – fiddle (1, 5, 10)
Mike Johnson – steel guitar (1, 3, 6-10, 13)
Charles Judge – keyboards (3, 4, 5, 7-13), string arrangements and composer (4)

Jennifer Kummer – french horn (4)
Lee Levine – clarinet (4)
Sam Levine – flute (4)
Max Martin – keyboards (2)
Chris McHugh – drums (1, 5, 7)
 Jerry McPherson – electric guitar (4, 9)
Gordon Mote – acoustic piano (3, 8)
Jimmy Nichols – keyboards (4, 6, 7, 9, 10, 11), acoustic piano (5, 13)
Eberhard Ramm – music copyist (4)
Shellback – guitar (2)
 Jimmie Lee Sloas – bass guitar (1, 3-9, 12, 13)
Christopher Stevens – keyboards (1), programming (1, 2)
Ilya Toshinsky – acoustic guitar (3-13)
 Jonathan Yudkin – cello (3), viola (3), violin (3, 8), string arrangements and composer (3)The Nashville String Machine (4)Anthony LaMarchina, Carole Rabinowitz and Julie Tanner – cello 
Jack Jezioro and Craig Nelson – string bass 
Monisa Angell, Bruce Christensen, Jim Grosjean, Betsy Lamb and Kristin Wilkinson – viola 
David Angell, Janet Darnall, David Davidson, Conni Ellisor, Carl Gorodetzky, Stefan Petrescu, Pamela Sixfin, Alan Umstead, Catherine Umstead, Mary K. Vanosdale, Bruce Wethey and Karen Winkelmann – violinGroup vocals (1)Chris Ashburn
Tristin Brock-Jones
Shawn Daughtery
Nathan Dickinson 
Kerri P. Edwards
Josh Fulmer

Kerrie Hardwick
Wes Hightower 
Tim Hunze
Brett James
Aaron Kasdorf
Kelly King
Kristen WinesProduction'

 
Chris Ashburn – assistant recording (1–13), mix assistant (1, 3–13), additional recording (2)
Adam Ayan – mastering
Tracy Baskett Fleaner – packaging
Derek Bason – recording (1, 3–13), mixing (1, 3–13), additional recording (2)
Mark Bright – producer (1, 3–13)
Tristin Brock-Jones – additional and assistant recording (1, 3–13)
Shawn Daughtery – additional and assistant recording (1, 3–13)
Nathan Dickinson – digital editing
Judy Forde Blair – creative director, liner notes

Mike "Frog" Griffith – production coordinator 
Tammie Harris Cleek – imaging production 
Scott McDaniel – creative director, cover design 
Max Martin – producer (2), recording (2)
Julie Matos – styling
Matthew Rolston – photography
Shellback – producer (2), recording (2)
Christopher Stevens – additional recording (1, 3–13)
Todd Tidwell – additional recording (1, 3–13)
Francesca Tolot – make-up
Robert Vetica – hair
Kristen Wines – production assistant

Charts

Weekly charts

Year-end charts

Decade-end charts

Certifications

Release history

References

External links
 

2009 albums
Albums produced by Mark Bright (record producer)
Arista Records albums
Carrie Underwood albums
19 Recordings albums
Arista Nashville albums